Bebearia congolensis is a butterfly in the family Nymphalidae. It is found in the equatorial zone, possibly including Cameroon, Gabon, the Republic of the Congo and the Democratic Republic of the Congo. The habitat consists of forests.

References

Butterflies described in 1889
congolensis
Butterflies of Africa